QtRuby is a binding of the application framework Qt for Ruby. Korundum is an additional set of bindings for KDE which extend QtRuby.

QtRuby is cross-platform, as all the underlying technologies are platform agnostic.

QtRuby hello world 

require 'Qt4'

app = Qt::Application.new(ARGV)

hello = Qt::PushButton.new('Hello World!')
hello.resize(200, 30)
hello.show

app.exec

The Korundum documentation proposes a more "rubyish" version of this program.

Notable applications that use QtRuby

 Kubeplayer, a video player dedicated to play online videos.
 Kaya, a Qt/KDE-based application to play chess, shogi and variants thereof.
 Yast 2, [OpenSUSE] control center

Status and maintenance

Currently, QtRuby is maintained (if at all) as part of Korundum.

A third-party implementation, named "qtbindings" in the Rubygems repository, has been made due to the lack of active development. Stated goals of the project include keeping an up-to-date version of the Qt framework for Ruby, as well as improving compatibility with non-Linux systems. As of December 2013, it supports Ruby 2.0 and 1.9, but not 1.8.

References

External links 
 

KDE Platform
Qt (software)
Ruby (programming language)
Widget toolkits